İdil Fırat (born 5 November 1972) is a Turkish actress.

Biography 
İdil Fırat was born in Ankara on 5 November 1972. She graduated in theatre from Dokuz Eylül University's Conservatory. She worked at İzmir State Theatre, İzmir Child Theatre, Ankara Art Theatre and Dormen Theatre. Fırat  has appeared in series such as Yüzleşme, Ayrılsak da Beraberiz, Aşk ve Gurur, 90-60-90, Deli Yürek and Köprü, and films such as Kolay Para, Gülüm, G.O.R.A, Münferit and Kaybedenler Kulübü.

Filmography 
Rüzgar Gülü (1999)
Yüzleşme (1999)
Ayrılsak da Beraberiz (1999)
Deli Yürek (1999)
Oyun Bitti (2000)
Evdeki Yabancı (2000)
90-60-90 (2001)
Gülüm (2002)
Zerda (2002)
Kolay Para (2002)
Aşk ve Gurur (2002)
Bir İstanbul Masalı (2003)
Vizontele Tuuba (2004)
G.O.R.A (2004)
Karım ve Annem (2004)
Canın Sağolsun (2005)
Seher Vakti (2005)
Kabuslar Evi: Gece Gelen Arkadaşla (2006)
Köprü (2006)
Münferit (2007)
Kalpsiz Adam (2008)
Geniş Aile (2009)
Arka Sokaklar (2009)
Kirli Beyaz (2010)
Kaybedenler Kulübü (2011)
Nar (2011)
Kalbim Seni Seçti (2011)
Şubat (2012)
Çıplak Gerçek (2012)
Acayip Hikâyeler (2012)
Senin Hikâyen (2013)
Ben Onu Çok Sevdim (2013)
Leyla ile Mecnun (2013)
Hayat Ağacı (2014)
Poyraz Karayel (2015)
Mehmed: Bir Cihan Fatihi (2018)
Ramo (2020)

References

External links 
 

1972 births
Dokuz Eylül University alumni
Living people
Actresses from Ankara
Turkish film actresses
Turkish stage actresses
Turkish television actresses
20th-century Turkish actresses